The Gallant Fox Handicap is a discontinued Thoroughbred horse race in New York City which was run annually from 1939 through 2009. Hosted by the now defunct Jamaica Race Course in Jamaica, Queens from inception through 1957, it was then moved to Aqueduct Racetrack in the Borough of Ozone Park, Queens, New York. The race was open to horses age three and older and although contested on dirt at various distances for the most part it was a longer distance race.

The race was named for Gallant Fox, the second winner of the U.S. Triple Crown in 1930.

Historical notes
The inaugural running took place on October 12, 1939 at the Jamaica track and was won by Belair Stud Stable's Isolater whose jockey, James Stout, and his trainer, Jim Fitzsimmons would both have careers that led to induction in the U.S. Racing Hall of Fame.
 
On December 13, 1975, Edward R. Scharps' gelding Sharp Gary won the 1⅝ mile Gallant Fox Handicap in track record time. Ten days later Sharp Gary won the 2¼ mile Display Handicap, the longest major stakes event in North America. Future U.S. and Canadian Horse Racing Hall of Fame inductee Sandy Hawley was aboard Gary Sharp for both wins.

As a result of bad weather, the 2000 Gallant Fox Handicap was rescheduled and raced on January 1, 2001.

With long-distance racing steadily declining in popularity with fans, and breeding now almost exclusively designed for speed, after seventy one years the Gallant Fox was canceled following the 2009 edition.

Records
Speed record:
 2:40 2/5 @ 1 miles : Gary Sharp (1975)

Most wins:
 3 – Coyote Lakes (2000, 2001, 2002) 

Most wins by a jockey:
 4 – Mike Luzzi (2000, 2002, 2005, 2007)

Most wins by a trainer:
 4 – Max Hirsch (1942, 1946, 1947, 1950)
 4 – H. Allen Jerkens (1957, 1958, 1965, 1983)
 4 – Bruce N. Levine (1998, 2000, 2001, 2002)

Most wins by an owner:
 4 – Roderick J. Valente (1998, 2000, 2001, 2002)

Winners

 † In 1972, Autobiography finished first, but was disqualified and set back to second.

Other past and present North American marathon races
On dirt: 
 Annual Champion Stakes
 Daingerfield Handicap
 Display Handicap 
 Empire City Gold Cup
 Gallant Man Handicap
 Brooklyn Handicap
 Fort Harrod Stakes
 Tokyo City Cup
 Valedictory Stakes

On turf:
 American St. Leger Stakes
 Canadian International Stakes
 Carleton F. Burke Handicap
 San Juan Capistrano Handicap

References

Discontinued horse races in New York City
Open long distance horse races
Recurring sporting events established in 1939
Recurring sporting events disestablished in 2010
Aqueduct Racetrack
Jamaica Race Course